The banded darter (Sympetrum pedemontanum) is a European species of dragonfly of the family Libellulidae.

Description
Males of the banded darter, like most members of the genus, have a red abdomen. The species' primary distinguishing feature however is the presence, in both sexes, of broad black bands across the outer section of each wing. It is similar in size to the black darter (Sympetrum danae) (35-40mm), sharing the broad hindwings and black legs.

Behaviour
The weak, low, fluttering flight is not unlike that of a black darter, but it perches frequently on the tips of rush stems rather than on the ground. It is a surprisingly inconspicuous species.

Status

This species is resident in continental Europe. Its main breeding range is south-eastern, especially at medium altitudes, although it appears to be spreading westwards.

Vagrancy to Britain
The banded darter has been recorded in Britain just once, in Wales, in the Sympetrum immigration year of 1995 on 16–17 August.

References

Fauna Europaea

Libellulidae
Dragonflies of Europe
Insects described in 1776